The Financial Secretary to the War Office  and for certain periods known as the Finance Member of the Army Council, was a junior ministerial office of the British government established in 1870. In May 1947 the office was unified with that of the Parliamentary Under Secretary of State for War under a new title Parliamentary Under Secretary of State and Financial Secretary of the War Office. The office continued until the War Office as a distinct service ministry was unified along with the Department of Admiralty and Air Ministry into the Ministry of Defence where it became known as the Army Department in April 1964.

History
In 1870 a Financial Secretary to the War Office was appointed and was responsible to the Secretary of State for War, for estimates and for the appropriation, accounting and audit of funds voted for military purposes. The Audit and Accounts departments previously under a chief auditor of army accounts (office was abolished) were merged into a new Finance Department under the Accountant General now reporting to the Financial Secretary. Following organisational changes within the War Office between 1887 and 1888 he was given additional responsibilities. By the end of 1888 his department was renamed the Civil Department. At the same time the Finance Department was enlarged and renamed the Finance Division, which continued under the superintendence of the Accountant General.

In 1895 Accountant General changed his title to Assistant Financial Secretary and Accountant General of the Army. In 1902 the Finance Division was renamed the Finance Branch. In 1904 the Financial Secretary was restyled as the Finance Member (FM) of the Army Council with general responsibility for the finance of the Army. In 1907 his civil department was renamed the Department of the Finance Member until 1922 when both his title and department were altered to the Department of the Financial Secretary until 1939. His office and department reverted to its previous name the Department of the Finance Member in 1942. During this period the executive duties of his office were gradually transferred to the Permanent Secretary's department. In May 1947 the Army Council was reconstituted and unified his office with that of the Parliamentary Secretary into a single appointment as the Parliamentary Under Secretary of State and Financial Secretary to the War Office until 1964.

Prior to 1947 the office holder's department consisted of numerous departments and directorates, after 1947 he was solely concerned with general political aspects of financial  policy and had no further roles were assigned to him.

Office Holders

References

Sources
 "Financial Secretary to the War Office (Hansard)". api.parliament.uk. Hansard. Retrieved 25 September 2019.
 Joiner, J. H. (1990). One more river to cross : the story of British military bridging. Barnsley: Pen and Sword. .
 Roper, Michael (1998). The Records of the War Office and Related Departments, 1660-1964. London: Public Record Office. .

Defunct ministerial offices in the United Kingdom
1870 establishments in the United Kingdom
1947 disestablishments in the United Kingdom
Ministries disestablished in 1946
Ministries established in 1870
War Office
War Office in World War II